Frederick Lincoln Emory (April 10, 1867 – December 31, 1919) was an American football coach and professor of mechanics and applied mathematics. He served as the first head football coach at West Virginia University, coaching one game in 1891. The single game that he coached was played on November 28, 1891 against Washington and Jefferson. The West Virginia Mountaineers lost by a score of 72 to zero, the second-worst loss in the history of the program.

He died in 1919 from heart-related problems.

Head coaching record

References

External links
 

1867 births
1919 deaths
West Virginia Mountaineers football coaches
People from Lunenburg, Massachusetts
Sportspeople from Worcester County, Massachusetts
Coaches of American football from Massachusetts
American mathematicians